ACDP may refer to:

 Arab Community Development Program, non-governmental community organization based in Istanbul Turkey founded in 2016. 

African Christian Democratic Party, a South African conservative political party founded in 1993
Advisory Committee on Dangerous Pathogens, a UK non-departmental public body established in 1981